"It's Not Fair" is an R&B song by Glenn Lewis, released on April 2, 2002. Produced by Dre & Vidal, it was the second single from his debut album, World Outside My Window. The song is about a cheating girlfriend and a disloyal best friend.

Music video
The song's music video was directed by Chris Robinson. In the video, Lewis goes home and finds his woman in bed with his friend. An argument ensues, and his friend leaves the house.

Track listing

CD single
 "It's Not Fair" (Radio Edit)
 "It's Not Fair" (Album Version)
 "It's Not Fair" (Instrumental)
 "It's Not Fair" (A Cappella)
 "It's Not Fair" (Callout Hook)

12" single
A-side
 "It's Not Fair" (Radio Edit)
 "It's Not Fair" (Instrumental)
 "It's Not Fair" (A Cappella)

B-side
 "Never Too Late" (Album Version)
 "Never Too Late" (Instrumental)

Chart positions

References

 

2001 songs
2002 singles
Glenn Lewis songs
Epic Records singles
Songs written by Vidal Davis
Songs written by Andre Harris
Song recordings produced by Dre & Vidal
Music videos directed by Chris Robinson (director)
Songs written by Glenn Lewis